Brett Ralph (born March 3, 1982 in Raymond, Alberta) is a former professional Canadian football receiver, who most recently played with the Canadian Football League's Calgary Stampeders. He is the younger brother of fellow CFL receiver Brock Ralph.

Professional career

Ralph was drafted in the 2005 CFL Draft in the 6th round by the Calgary Stampeders. He immediately became part of the team's receiving corps. In his rookie season he finished fourth in receiving on the team with 609 yards.

2006 was an off year for him, recording only seven receptions for 76 yards, finishing eighth on the team.

2007 was a return to form, catching 53 passes for 695 yards. His duties on the team were expanded to include holding for placekicks. He threw a touchdown on a fake field goal play in the Stampeders game against the Argonauts on July 21.

On May 31, 2010, Ralph announced his retirement from professional football in order to concentrate on his education to become a teacher.

Career statistics

References

External links
Brett Ralph on CFL

1982 births
Living people
Alberta Golden Bears football players
Calgary Stampeders players
Canadian football wide receivers
People from Raymond, Alberta
Sportspeople from Alberta